Scutiger boulengeri (common names: Boulenger's lazy toad, Boulenger's high altitude toad, Himalayan stream frog, and Xizang alpine toad) is a species of toad in the family Megophryidae. It is found in Nepal, India (Sikkim) and western China (Sichuan, Yunnan, Gansu, Qinghai, and Tibet). This is one of the highest elevations where amphibians have ever been recorded (Pleurodema marmoratum has been recorded higher at the Andes).

Description
The head is flat, wider than long and with a rounded snout. The eyes are protruding. The tympanum is indistinct; the supratympanal fold is present. The dorsum is olive or greenish-grey with numerous warts. The ventrum is yellowish. The fingers have no webbing whereas the toes have rudimentary webbing.

Habitat and conservation
They hibernate in loose soil from September to March or April.

Scutiger boulengeri is a very common species but potentially threatened by diversion of water for agriculture, pollution from agrochemicals, and overgrazing. However, it is not considered threatened overall.

References

boulengeri
Amphibians of China
Fauna of Tibet
Frogs of India
Amphibians of Nepal
Amphibians described in 1898
Taxa named by Jacques von Bedriaga